The New Moon was a rock music venue in Paris during the 1990s. Noir Désir, the French Lovers, Mano Negra, the Naked Apes of Reason were a few of the many groups who performed. The building was formerly the Nouvelle Athens, where the Impressionist gathered at the end of the 19th century. The New Moon was situated in the red light district of the Place Pigalle.

See also
La Nouvelle Athènes

External links
  The New Monico in 1925
  Destruction of the New Moon

Former music venues in France

https://www.facebook.com/home.php#!/pages/New-Moon-Paris/176520909037967